Brad North (born January 21, 1985) is an American retired soccer player and now businessman.  A 6'1", 190 lb. forward from Northwestern University, North was a two-time All Big Ten first team selection, scoring 28 goals (10 GWG), 8 assists over a four-year career, and a three-time Big Ten Academic All-Conference Team.  North was the first player from Northwestern U. to be picked in the MLS SuperDraft.

Playing career

MLS
North was selected by D.C. United in the second round (24th overall) of the 2007 MLS SuperDraft. He appeared in each of the reserve's 12 games (11 starts), seeing time at both forward and as a defender. Started in the US Open Cup match at Harrisburg, which would be his only official appearance for the club. He was waived the following year.

Made 3 appearances during the 2008 season with the Fire Reserves against teams including; former club D.C United (30 min, 1 goal), Columbus Crew (41 min), and F.C. Toronto (37 min, 1 goal).

Premier Development League
North made 13 appearances for the Chicago Fire Premier of the Premier Development League's Great Lakes division in 2006 and had one assist in the regular season and 2 overtime goals in the first playoff game before the Des Moines Menace answered with two goals to force a shoot-out (which the Chicago Fire Premier won).

See also
 List of current American soccer players by US state

References

1985 births
Living people
American soccer players
Chicago Fire U-23 players
D.C. United players
Northwestern Wildcats men's soccer players
USL League Two players
D.C. United draft picks
Soccer players from Texas
Association football forwards